The Körsch Viaduct is a bridge that crosses the Körsch Valley (river Körsch) in Germany, supporting a road around Nellingen. It was built from 1991 to 1993 by incremental launch. It was handed over to the public on 6 September 1995. The bridge also crosses a 110 kilovolt power line of the EnBW AG and a sewage treatment.

Buildings and structures in Baden-Württemberg
Bridges completed in 1993
Road bridges in Germany
Viaducts in Germany